Splendid Politics is a 2015 South Korean television series starring Cha Seung-won, Lee Yeon-hee, Kim Jaewon, Seo Kang-joon, Han Joo-wan and Jo Sung-ha. It aired on MBC from April 13 to September 29, 2015 on Mondays and Tuesdays at 22:00 for 50 episodes.

The Korean title Hwajeong is a shortened version of Hwaryeohan Jeongchi (literally "Splendid Politics").

Plot
Prince Gwanghae (portrayed by Cha Seung-won), son of a concubine, usurps the Joseon throne from the direct bloodline of his father, King Seonjo (portrayed by Park Yeong-gyu).

After her younger brother, Grand Prince Yeongchang (portrayed by Jeon Jin-seo), is executed, Princess Jeongmyeong (portrayed by Lee Yeon-hee), who managed to flee the palace during the massacre, starts living as a commoner disguised as a man while plotting her revenge.

Cast

Main
Cha Seung-won as Yi Hon, Prince Gwanghae
Lee Tae-hwan as young Yi Hon
Lee Yeon-hee as Princess Jeongmyeong
Jung Chan-bi as young Princess Jeongmyeong
Heo Jung-eun as child Princess Jeongmyeong
Kim Jae-won as Prince Neungyang, later King Injo
Seo Kang-joon as Hong Joo-won
Yoon Chan-young as young Hong Joo-won
Choi Kwon-soo as child Hong Joo-won
Han Joo-wan as Kang In-woo
Ahn Do-gyu as young Kang In-woo
Lee Tae-woo as child Kang In-woo
Jo Sung-ha as Kang Joo-sun, Kang In-woo's father

Supporting

Royal Household
Park Yeong-gyu as King Seonjo
Shin Eun-jung as Queen Inmok 
Choi Jong-hwan as Prince Imhae
Jang Seung-jo as Prince Jeongwon, Prince Neungyang's father
Kim Gyu-sun as Princess Jeonghye
Jeon Jin-seo as Grand Prince Yeongchang
Lee Seung-ah as Queen Inryeol
Baek Sung-hyun as Crown Prince Sohyeon
Shin Ki-joon as child Crown Prince Sohyeon
Kim Hee-jung as Crown Princess Minhoe
Lee Tae-ri as Grand Prince Bongrim, later King Hyojong
Song Jun-hee as child Grand Prince Bongrim
Kim Min-seo as Jo Yeo-jeong / Royal Consort So-yong of the Okcheon Jo clan
Choi Woo-jin as Yi Jing, Prince Sungseon

Northern Faction (Gwanghae Group)
Jung Woong-in as Lee Yi-cheom
Kim Yeo-jin as Court Lady Kim Gae-shi
Jo Jung-eun as young Kim Gae-shi
Shin Rin-ah as child Kim Gae-shi
Han Myung-koo as Chung In-hong
Yoo Seung-mok as Yoo Hee-boon
Jung Kyu-soo as Lee Choong
Lee Jae-gu as the Chief Eunuch

Western Faction (Injo Group)
Jo Min-ki as Kim Ja-jeom
Park Jun-gyu as Kim Ryu
Jang Gwang as Yi Gwi
Kim Hyung-beom as Kim Kyung-jing, Kim Ryu's son
Lee Seung-hyo as Lee Si-baek
Kim Seo-kyung as Lee Si-bang
Jung Wook as a State Ceremony Eunuch

People around Princess Jeongmyeong
Im Ho as Choi Myung-gil
Lee Jae-yong as Kim Sang-hun
Kim Chang-wan as Lee Won-ik
Kim Seung-wook as Lee Hang-bok
Um Hyo-sup as Hong Yeong, Hong Joo-won's father
Kim Young-im as Court Lady Jung
Gong Myung as Ja-gyung
Kang Chan-hee as young Ja-gyung

Other subordinates
Ahn Nae-sang as Heo Gyun
Lee Sung-min as Lee Duk-hyung
Nam Da-reum as young Duk-hyung
Park Ji-il as Kim Je-nam, Queen Inmok's father
Jung Hae-kyun as Kang Hong-rib

Cameo
Park Won-sang as Jang Bong-soo
Kim Kwang-kyu as Yi Yeong-bu
Kwak Dong-yeon as Yi Ui-rip
Jo Jae-ryong as Bang-Geun
Lee Seung-hyung as Yi-seo
Kim Hyun as Court Lady Inspector
Hwang Young-hee as Ok-joo 
Baek Su-ryeon as Soo Ryun-gae
Lee Jae-gu
Kim Ki-bang as Gu-bok
Kim Kyu-chul
Kang Shin-il
Jung Ji-so as Eun-seol
Kang Dae-hyun as Su-Deok
Kang Moon-young as Lady Yoon, Kang Joo-sun's wife
Kim So-yi as Court Lady Choi
Baek Soo-ryun as Soo Ryun-gae
Jang Hyuk-jin as Maruno
Jung Sung-woon as Hong Taiji
Kim Joon-bae as Yong Gol-dae

Ratings 
In the table below, the blue numbers represent the lowest ratings and the red numbers represent the highest ratings.

Awards and nominations

Notes

References

External links
Splendid Politics official MBC website 

Hwajung, Princess of Light at MBC Global Media

2015 South Korean television series debuts
2015 South Korean television series endings
MBC TV television dramas
South Korean historical television series
Television series by Kim Jong-hak Production
Television series set in the Joseon dynasty